Miss X is an unidentified deceased woman whose body was found March 18, 1967, near the towns of Bear, Wilmington, and Glasgow, Delaware. Originally, investigators thought she died during (or as the result of) an abortion attempt, which was illegal at the time. A more detailed examination had determined that she and her unborn child died of sepsis. Foul play is suspected due to the circumstances of the discovery of her body, and the manner of death is listed on her death certificate as a homicide.

On January 25, 2023, her Doe Network page was marked as "Identified". Her identity was leaked on the Doe Network's Twitter account as Patrona "Patra" Patmios, a missing woman of Greek descent from New Jersey, though this has not yet been confirmed by law enforcement.

Circumstances

Miss X's body was found on the side of Porter Road on March 18, 1967. She was wearing only a pair of blue bikini-like underwear, the manufacturer's label of which had been removed. A red ribbon tied her hair back from her face. The victim's legs were encased in a whitish-colored canvas laundry bag, which had "Bag O - Storage. American Laundry. Dry Cleaning. EX4 5277." printed on it. It is not clear if she was associated with such an establishment.

It is believed Miss X died in a different location from where she was found.

The victim was three months pregnant at the time of her death. Originally, investigators thought she had died from an abortion; a substance resembling an abortion-inducing chemical was found in her vaginal cavity. However, the true cause of death was an untreated infection of unknown origin.

Physical characteristics
She had a large bra size, estimated at 34DD. She had dark curly hair and brown eyes, leading some to speculate she was of Southern European origin, perhaps from Greece or Italy. Some have also said she appeared to be of "Jewish descent". The young woman's body had no marks other than a vaccination scar on her left upper leg. Her blood type was "O." Her ears were pierced but it did not appear she had worn earrings recently. She had cared for her teeth very well; there was some evidence of tooth repair and she likely saw a dentist approximately six months before her death. Her age was originally estimated between eighteen and twenty-one years old, but the age range has been widened to sixteen to twenty-five years.

Investigation

Detectives have focused primarily on identifying Miss X instead of finding the individuals who disposed of her body or may have been involved in her death. Because of the significant amount of time that has passed, investigators say the suspects would either be "dead or elderly".

The laundry bag found at the scene was traced to a company known as American Laundry, which operated in Trenton, New Jersey. When asked about the victim, members of the owner's family said that they remembered a young woman, matching Miss X's description, who either lived nearby or was a customer.

An anonymous caller told police he brought a woman's body from the state of Washington to Delaware, but little information about this tip has been published. This lead is somewhat questionable, as Miss X was deceased for less than twenty-four hours and it would have taken a considerable amount of time to transport the body from such a distance.

The case was re-examined in 2011, when a vial of the victim's blood and her hair ribbon were found in an evidence container. Her DNA linked her, maternally, to individuals in Virginia and North Carolina. However, when contacted, those individuals told investigators they did not know who Miss X is.

Early in the investigation, a sketch of Miss X was released to the public. In 2013, the National Center for Missing & Exploited Children reconstructed her face with a much more precise and detailed method.

See also
List of unsolved deaths
Spokane Millie Doe
Perry County Jane Doe
Ruth Marie Terry
Murder of Joseph Augustus Zarelli
Killing of Evelyn Colon

Gallery

References

Notes

External links 

1967 deaths
1940s births
Deaths from sepsis
People from New Castle County, Delaware
Unidentified American children
Unidentified decedents in the United States
Unsolved deaths in the United States
History of women in Delaware